SGH may mean:

Seven Group Holdings, Australian company
Shughni language (with the ISO 639 3 code 'sgh')
Warsaw School of Economics (Szkoła Główna Handlowa)
Singapore General Hospital, a hospital in Outram, Singapore
Southern General Hospital, Glasgow, Scotland
Simpson Gumpertz & Heger, US engineering company